This is a list of players who have played at least one game for the Phoenix Roadrunners (1989–90 to 1996–97) of the International Hockey League  (IHL).

:Name: (years played): position: birth date: Home Town



A
Peter Ahola (1991–1992) Defense, 1968-05-14 Espoo, Finland
 Brad Aitken (1989–1990) Left Wing, 1967-10-30 Scarborough, ONT
 Mel Angelstad (1995–1996) Left Wing, 1971-10-31 Saskatoon, SASK
 Mark Astley (1996–1997) Defense, 1969-03-30 Calgary, ALTA

B
Ruslan Batyrshin (1995–1997) Defense, 1975-02-19 Moscow, Russia
 Darren Beals (1989–1990) Goalie, 1968-08-28 Dartmouth, NS
 Frederik Beaubien (1995–1996) Goalie, 1975-04-01 Lauzon, PQ
 Nick Beaulieu (1989–1991) Left Wing, 1968-08-19 Rimouski, PQ
 Jerome Bechard (1990–1991) Left Wing, 1969-03-30 Regina, SASK
 Hugo Belanger (1996–1997) Left Wing, 1970-05-28 St. Hubert, PQ
 Aki-Petteri Berg (1995–1997) Defense, 1977-07-28 Turku, Finland
 Bob Berg (1991–1993) Left Wing, 1970-07-02 Beamsville, ONT
 Mike Berger (1989–1990) Defense, 1967-06-02 Edmonton, ALTA
 Jean-Claude Bergeron (1996–1997) Goalie, 1968-10-14 Hauterive, PQ
 Andy Bezeau (1994–1995) Left Wing, 1970-03-30 Saint John, NB
 Scott Bjugstad (1990–1993) Forward, 1961-06-02 St. Paul, MN
 Arto Blomsten (1994–1996) Defense, 1965-03-16 Vaasa, Finland
 John Blue (1989–1996) Goalie, 1966-02-19 Huntington Beach, CA
 Mike Boback (1995–1996) Centre, 1970-08-13 Mt. Clemens, MI
 Mike Bodnarchuk (1993–1994) Right Wing, 1970-03-26 Bramalea, ONT
 Derek Booth (1991–1992) Defense, 1970-07-19 Niagara Falls, ONT
 Philippe Boucher (1995–1996) Defense, 1973-03-24 St. Apollinaire, PQ
 Bruce Boudreau (1989–1990) Centre, 1955-01-09 Toronto, ONT
 Frank Breault (1991–1993) Right wing, 1967-05-11 Acton Vale, PQ
 Tim Breslin (1991–1994) Left wing, 1967-12-08 Downers Grove, IL
 Dan Brierly (1996–1997) Defense, 1974-01-23 Brewster, NY
 Neal Broten (1996–1997) Centre, 1959-11-29 Roseau, MN
 Scott Brower (1989–1990) Goalie, 1964-09-26 Viking, ALTA
 Kevin Brown (1994–1996) Right wing, 1974-05-11 Birmingham, England
 Rob Brown (1994–1995) Right Wing, 1968-04-10 Kingston, ONT
 Sean Brown (1994–1995) Right Wing, 1973-03-30 Oshawa, ONT
 Jim Burton (1995–1996) Defense, 1963-11-06 Brantford, ONT
 Dan Bylsma (1994–1996) Right Wing, 1970-09-19 Grand Haven, MI

C
Rene Chapdelaine (1990–1993) Defense, 1966-09-27 Weyburn, SASK
 Brian Chapman (1993–1997) Defense, 1968-02-10 Brockville, ONT
 Stephane Charbonneau (1993–1994) Right Wing, 1970-06-27 St. Adele, PQ
 Jeff Chychrun (1991–1993) Defense, 1966-05-03 LaSalle, PQ
 Kerry Clark (1989–1990) Right Wing, 1968-08-21 Kelvington, SASK
 Sylvain Couturier (1990–1993) Left wing, 1968-04-23 Greenfield Park, PQ
 Rob Cowie (1994–1996) Defense, 1967-11-03 Willowdale, ONT
 Phil Crowe (1992–1994) Right wing, 1970-04-14 Nanton, ALTA
 Ted Crowley (1996–1997) Defense, 1970-05-03 Concord, MA
 Dan Currie (1993–1995) Left wing, 1968-03-15 Burlington, ONT

D
 Byron Dafoe (1994–1995) Goalie, 1971-02-25 Sussex, England
 Andrew Dale (1996–1997) Centre, 1976-02-16 Sudbury, ONT
 Mike DeCarle (1989–1990) Right Wing, 1966-08-20 Covina, CA
 Shawn Dineen (1989–1990) Defense, 1958-03-01 Detroit, MI
 Paul DiPietro (1996–1997) Centre, 1970-09-08 Sault Ste. Marie, ONT
 Wayne Doucet (1994–1995) Left Wing, 1970-06-19 Mississauga, ONT
 Scott Drevitch (1990–1991) Defense, 1965-09-09 Brookline, MA
 John Druce (1993–1994) Right Wing, 1966-02-23 Peterborough, ONT
 Stan Drulia (1989–1990) Right Wing, 1968-01-05 Elmira, NY
 Iain Duncan (1991–1992) Left Wing, 1963-08-04 Toronto, ONT

E
Devin Edgerton (1994–1996) Centre, 1970-06-11 Kindersley, SASK
 David Emma (1996–1997) Right Wing, 1969-01-14 Cranston, RI
 Randy Exelby (1989–1990) Goalie, 965-08-13 Toronto, ONT

F
Scott Feasby (1994–1995) Defense, 1970-11-20 Port Perry, ONT
 Craig Ferguson (1995–1996) Centre, 1970-04-08 Castro Valley, CA
 Larry Floyd (1989–1990) Right Wing, 1961-05-01 Peterborough, ONT
 Marc Fortier (1992–1994) Centre, 1966-02-26 Windsor, PQ
 Joe Frederick (1996–1997) Right Wing, 1969-06-08 Madison, WI

G
Michael Gaul (1994–1995) Defense, 1973-04-28 Lachine, PQ
 Todd Gillingham (1996–1997) Left Wing, 1970-01-31 Labrodor City, NF
 Darryl Gilmour (1990–1993) Goalie, 1967-02-13 Winnipeg, MAN
 Mike Glover (1989–1990) Right Wing, 1968-07-23 Ottawa, ONT
 Mario Gosselin (1990–1991) Goalie, 1963-06-15 Thetford Mines, PQ
 David Goverde (1990–1995) Goalie, 1970-04-09 Toronto, ONT
 Kevin Grant (1992–1994) Defense, 1969-01-09 Toronto, ONT
 Steve Graves (1990–1991) Left Wing, 1964-04-07 Trenton, ONT
 Keith Gretzky (1989–1990) Centre, 1967-02-16 Brantford, ONT
 Brent Grieve (1995–1997 (Left Wing, 1969-05-09 Oshawa, ONT
 Brad Guzda (1996–1997) Goalie, 1973-04-28 Banff, ALTA

H
David Haas (1993–1994) Left Wing, 1968-06-23 Toronto, ONT
 Bob Halkidis (1990–1991) Defense, 1966-03-05 Toronto, ONT
 Mark Hardy (1993–1994) Defense, 1959-02-01 Semaden, Switzerland
 Todd Harkins (1996–1997) Centre, 1968-10-08 Cleveland, OH
 Scott Harlow (1990–1991) Left Wing, 1963-10-11 East Bridgewater, MA
 Rick Hayward (1990–1991) Defense, 1966-02-25 Toledo, OH
 Jamie Hearn (1996–1997) Defense, 1971-02-23 Quesnel, BC
 Jim Hiller (1992–1993) Right Wing, 1969-05-15 Port Alberni, BC
 Justin Hocking (1993–1995) Defence, 1974-01-09 Stettler, ALTA
 Paul Holden (1991–1993) Defence, 1970-03-15 Kitchener, ONT
 Kelly Hrudey (1995–1996) Goalie, 1961-01-13 Edmonton, ALTA
 Mike Hudson (1996–1997) Centre, 1967-02-06 Guelph, ONT
 Dean Hulett (1993–1994) Right Wing, 1971-07-25 San Juan, PR

I

J
Pauli Jaks (1993–1995) Goalie, 1972-01-25 Schaffhausen, Switzerland
 Steve Jaques (1990–1992) Defense, 1969-02-21 Burnaby, BC
 Bob Jay (1993–1994) Defense, 1965-11-18 Burlington, MA
 Matt Johnson (1995–1996) Left Wing, 1975-11-23 Welland, ONT
 Steve Johnson (1989–1990) Forward, 1966-03-03 Grand Forks, ND

K
Trent Kaese (1989–1990) Right Wing, 1967-09-09 Nanaimo, BC
 Tom Karalis (1989–1990) Defense, 1964-05-24 Montreal, PQ
 Kyosti Karjalainen ( 1990–1992) Forward, 1967-06-19 , Sweden
 Ed Kastelic (1992–1993) Right Wing, 1964-01-29 Toronto, ONT
 Paul Kelly (1989–1990) Right Wing, 1967-04-17 Hamilton, ONT
 Bob Kennedy (1989–1990)
 Kevin Kerr (1989–1994) Right Wing, 1967-09-18 North Bay, ONT
 Rick Knickle (1993–1994) Goalie, 1960-02-26 Dartmouth, NS
 Fred Knipscheer (1996–1997) Centre, 1969-09-03 Ft. Wayne, IN
 Chris Kontos (1990–1991) Left Wing, 1963-12-10 Toronto, ONT
 Dave Korol (1989–1990) Defense, 1965-03-01 Winnipeg, MAN
 Igor Korolev (1996–1997) Centre, 1970-09-06 Moscow, Russia
 Ted Kramer (1992–1993) Right Wing, 1969-10-29 Findlay, OH

L
Eric Lacroix (1994–1995) Left Wing, 1971-07-15 Montreal, PQ
 Nathan LaFayette (1996–1997) Centre, 1973-02-17 New Westminster, BC
 Jason Lafreniere (1989–1990) Centre, 1966-12-06 St. Catharines, ONT
 Tom Laidlaw (1990–1991) Defense, 1958-04-15 Brampton, ONT
 Jeff Lamb (1989–1990)
 Robert Lang (1992–1994) Centre, 1970-12-19 Teplice, Czech
 Marc Laniel (1989–1990) Defense, 1968-01-16 Oshawa, ONT
 Rick Lanz (1991–1992) Defense, 1961-09-16 Karlovy Vary, Czech
 Steve Larouche (1995–1996) Centre, 1971-04-14 Rouyn-Noranda, PQ
 Eric Lavigne (1993–1995) Defense, 1972-11-14 Victoriaville, PQ
 Dominic Lavoie (1993–1994) Defense, 1967-11-21 Montreal, PQ
 Brian Lawton (1990–1991) Left Wing, 1965-06-29 New Brunswick, NJ
 Guy Leveque (1992–1995) Centre, 1972-12-28 Kingston, ONT
 Mikael Lindholm (1990–1991) Left Wing, 1964-12-19 Brynas, Sweden
 David Littman (1989–1990) Goalie, 1967-06-13 Cranston, RI
 Lonnie Loach (1992–1993) Left Wing, 1968-04-14 New Liskeard, ONT
 Chris Luongo (1989–1990) Defense, 1967-03-17 Detroit, MI

M
Kevin MacDonald (1989–1993) Defense, 1966-02-24 Prescott, ONT
 Andrew MacVicar (1989–1990) Left Wing, 1969-03-12 Dartmouth, NS
 Mike MacWilliam (1996–1997) Left Wing, 1967-02-14 Burnaby, BC
 Jeff Madill (1996–1997) Right Wing, 1965-06-21 Oshawa, ONT
 Jim Maher (1991–1994) Defense, 1970-06-30 Warren, MI
 Jacques Mailhot (1989–1990) Right Wing, 1961-12-05 Shawnigan, PQ
 Kurt Mallett (1996–1997) Right Wing, 1971-03-27 Saugus, MA
 George Maneluk (1992–1993) Goalie, 1967-07-25 Winnipeg, MAN
 Chris Marinucci (1996–1997) Centre, 1971-12-29 Grand Rapids, MN
 Don Martin (1989–1990) Defense, 1968-03-29 London, ONT
 Ivan Matulik (1989–1990) Right Wing, 1968-06-17 Nitra, Slovakia
 Roger Maxwell (1996–1997) Right Wing, 1975-11-21 Brampton, ONT
 Daryn McBride (1990–1991) Right Wing, 1968-03-29 Fort Saskatchewan, ALTA
 Brad McCaughey (1992–1993) Centre, 1966-06-10 Ann Arbor, MI
 Shawn McCosh (1991–1993) Centre, 1969-06-05 Oshawa, ONT
 Jim McGeough (1989–1990) Centre, 1963-04-13 Regina, SASK
 Brian McKee (1994–1995) Defense, 1964-12-13 Willowdale, ONT
 Steve McKenna (1996–1997) Defense, 1973-08-21 Toronto, ONT
 Ken McRae (1994–1997) Right Wing, 1968-04-23 Winchester, ONT
 Brian McReynolds (1993–1995) Centre, 1965-01-05 Penetanguishene, ONT
 Kris Miller (1991–1992) Defense, 1969-03-30 Bemidji, MN
 Jaroslav Modry (1996–1997) Defense, 1971-02-27 Ceske-Budejovice, Czech Rep.
 Carl Mokosak (1989–1990) Left Wing, 1962-09-22 Fort Saskatchewan, ALTA
 John Mokosak (1992–1993) Defense, 1963-09-07 Edmonton, ALTA
 Michel Mongeau (1996–1997) Centre, 1965-02-09 Nun's Island, PQ
 Jason Morgan (1996–1997) Centre, 1976-10-09 St. John's, NFLD
 Dave Moylan (1990–1991) Defense, 1967-08-13 Tillsonburg, ONT
 Rob Murphy (1993–1995) Centre, 1969-04-07 Hull, PQ
 Pat Murray (1993–1994) Left Wing, 1969-08-20 Stratford, ONT

N
Vaclav Nedomansky (1994–1996) Right Wing, 1971-01-05 Bratislava, Slovakia
 Jan Nemecek (1996–1997) Defense, 1976-02-14 Pisek, Czech
 Robbie Nichols (1989–1990) Right Wing, 1964-08-04 Hamilton, ONT
 Barry Nieckar (1991–1992) Left Wing, 1967-12-16 Rama, SASK
 Chris Norton (1991–1992)
 Richard Novak (1989–1990) Right Wing, 1966-02-19 Kamloops, BC

O
Sean O'Brien (1996–1997) Left Wing, 1972-02-09 Boston, MA
 Sean O'Donnell (1994–1995) Defense, 1971-10-13 Ottawa, ONT
 Billy O'Dwyer (1990–1992) Forward, 1960-01-25 South Boston, MA
 Mike O'Neill (1994–1995) Goalie, 1967-11-03 Montreal, PQ

P
Dave Pasin (1990–1991) Centre, 1966-07-08 Edmonton, ALTA
 Joe Paterson (1991–1992) Left Wing, 1960-06-25 Toronto, ONT
 Davis Payne (1993–1994) Right Wing, 1970-10-24 King City, ONT
 Randy Pearce (1994–1996) Left Wing, 1970-02-23 Kitchener, ONT
 Yanic Perreault (1994–1995) Centre, 1971-04-04 Sherbrooke, PQ
 Bryant Perrier (1989–1990) Defense, 1965-05-17 Vancouver, BC
 Barry Potomski (1994–1997) Right Wing, 1972-11-24 Windsor, ONT
 Petr Prajsler (1990–1991) Defense, 1965-09-21 Hradec Kralove, Czech

Q

R
Andre Racicot (1994–1995) Goalie, 1969-06-09 Rouyn-Noranda, PQ
 Eldon "Pokey" Reddick (1989–1990) Goalie, 1964-10-06 Halifax, NS
 Keith Redmond (1992–1996) Left Wing, 1972-10-25 Richmond Hill, ONT
 Carl Repp (1989–1990) Goalie, Kimberley, BC
 Eric Ricard (1990–1991) Defense, 1969-02-16 St. Cesaire, PQ
 Stephane Richer (1990–1991) Defense, 1966-04-28 Hull, PQ
 Dave Richter (1989–1990) Defense, 1960-04-08 Winnipeg, MAN
 Trevor Roenick (1996–1997) Right Wing, 1974-10-07 Derby, CT
 Jeff Rohlicek (1990–1992) Centre, 1966-01-27 Park Ridge, IL
 Steve Rooney (1990–1991) Forward, 1963-06-28 Canton, MA
 Serge Roy (1990–1991) Defense, 1962-06-25 Sept-Iles, PQ
 Mike Ruark (1991–1993) Defense, 1971-04-18 Calgary, ALTA
 Daniel Rydmark (1995–1996) Centre, 1970-02-23 Vasteras, Sweden

S
Brent Sapergia (1989–1990) Right Wing, 1962-11-16 Flin Flon, MAN
 Marc Saumier (1990–1993) Centre, 1969-04-18 Hull, PQ
 Rob Schena (1989–1990) Defense, 1967-02-05 Saugus, MA
 Chris Schmidt (1996–1997) Centre, 1976-03-01 Beaver Lodge, ALTA
 Doug Searle (1995–1996) Defense, 1972-03-21 Toronto, ONT
 Brett Seguin (1992–1995) Centre, 1972-02-20 St. Mary's, ONT
 Brandy Semchuk (1991–1994) Right Wing, 1971-09-22 Calgary, ALTA
 Peter Sentner (1990–1991) Defense, 1969-06-13 Boston, MA
 Daniel Shank (1993–1994) Right Wing, 1967-05-12 Montreal, PQ
 Oleg Shargorodsky (1995–1996) Defense, 1969-11-18 Kharkov, Ukraine
 Jeff Shevalier (1994–1997) Left Wing, 1974-03-14 Mississauga, ONT
 Gary Shuchuk (1994–1996) Centre, 1967-02-17 Edmonton, ALTA
 Ilkka Sinisalo (1991–1992) Forward, 1958-07-10 Valkeakoski, Finland
 John Slaney (1996–1997) Defense, 1972-02-07 St. John's, NFLD
 Doug Smith (1994–1995) Right Wing, 1964-12-27 Hanover, MA
 Vern Smith (1989–1992) Defense, 1964-05-30 Lethbridge, ALTA
 Brad Smyth (1996–1997) Right Wing, 1973-03-13 Ottawa, ONT
 Chris Snell (1994–1996) Defense, 1971-07-12 Regina, SASK
 Stephane Soulliere (1995–1997) Centre, 1975-05-30 Greenfield Park, PQ
 Ken Spangler (1989–1990) Defense, 1967-05-02 Edmonton, ALTA
 Graham Stanley (1990–1991) Right Wing, 1966-03-19 St. Catharine's, ONT
 Sergei Stas (1995–1996) Defense, 1974-04-28 Minsk, Belarus
 Robb Stauber (1990–1994) Goalie, 1967-11-25 Duluth, MN
 Dave Stewart (1992–1994) Defense, 1972-01-11 Norwood, ONT
 Jamie Storr (1995–1997) Goalie, 1975-12-28 Brampton, ONT
 Brian Straub (1994–1995) Defense, 1968-07-02 Elizabeth, NJ
 Marc Straub (1994–1995)
 Steve Strunk (1993–1994) Centre, 1968-08-01 Wausau, WI
 Ron Sutter (1995–1996) Centre, 1963-12-02 Viking, ALTA

T
Patrice Tardif (1996–1997) Centre, 1970-10-30 Saint-Methode-de-Fro, PQ
 Dave Thomlinson (1993–1997) Left Wing, 1966-10-22 Edmonton, ALTA
 Brent Thompson (1990–1997) Defense, 1971-01-09 Calgary, ALTA
 Jim Thomson (1991–1993) Right Wing, 1965-12-30 Edmonton, ALTA
 Brad Tiley (1992–1997) Defense, 1971-07-05 Markdale, ONT
 Grant Tkachuk (1989–1990) Left Wing, 1968-09-24 L.L. Biche, ALTA
 Doug Torrel (1996–1997) Right Wing, 1969-04-29 Hibbing, MN
 Dave Tretowicz (1991–1993)
 Soren True (1991–1992) Left Wing, 1968-02-09 Aarhus, Denmark
 Denis Tsygurov (1995–1996) Defense, 1971-02-26 Chelyabinsk, Russia

U

V
Nicholas Vachon (1994–1997) Left Wing, 1972-07-20 Montreal, PQ
 John Van Kessel (1990–1992) Right Wing, 1969-12-19 Bridgewater, NS
 John Vary (1992–1993) Defense, 1972-02-11 Owen Sound, ONT
 Darren Veitch (1995–1996) Defense, 1960-04-24 Saskatoon, SASK
 Mike Vellucci (1989–1990) Defense, 1966-08-11 Farmington, MI
 Jim Vesey (1993–1995) Centre, 1965-09-29 Charlestown, MA
 Mark Vichorek (1989–1990) Defense, 1963-01-05 Moose Lake, MN
 Mickey Volcan (1990–1991) Defense, 1962-03-03 Edmonton, ALTA
 Jan Vopat (1995–1997) Defense, 1973-03-22 Most, Czech Rep.
 Roman Vopat (1996–1997) Centre, 1976-04-21 Litvinov, Czech
 Mike Vukonich (1991–1994) Centre, 1968-11-05 Duluth, MN
 Igor Vyazmikin (1991–1992) Left Wing, 1966-01-08 Moscow, Russia

W
Tim Watters (1991–1995) Defense, 1959-07-25 Kamloops, BC
 Sean Whitham (1989–1990) Defense, 1967-03-13 Verdun, PQ
 Sean Whyte (1990–1996) Right wing, 1970-05-04 Sudbury, ONT
 Darryl Williams (1990–1994) Left Wing, 1968-02-29 Labrador City, NF
 Ross Wilson (1991–1992) Right Wing, 1969-06-26 The Pas, MAN
 Steve Wilson (1994–1996) Defense, 1968-09-03 Belleville, ONT

X

Y
Vitali Yachmenev (1994–1995) Left Wing, 1975-01-08 Chelyabinsk, Russia
 Scott Young (1990–1991) Defense, 1965-05-26 Oakville, ONT

Z
Rick Zombo (1996–1997) Defense, 1963-05-08 Des Plaines, IL

Lists of ice hockey players
 
Phoenix Roadrunners players